Fiona Raby (born 1963) is a British artist and University Professor of Design and Social Inquiry at The New School. She served as professor of Industrial Design at the University of Applied Arts Vienna. She was also a member of the research and teaching staff at the Royal College of Art (RCA) from 1994 to 2015. She left to focus on her partnership with Dunne & Raby. Her work, in collaboration with partner Anthony Dunne, is part of the Museum of Modern Art's (MoMA) permanent collection.

She studied Architecture at the RCA, before completing an MPhil in Computer Related Design (CRD) at the RCA. She is one of the founding members of the CRD Research Studio at RCA.  In 2001, she was shortlisted for the Perrier-Jouet design prize.

With partner Anthony Dunne, Fiona moved their teaching practice from the Royal College of Art (RCA) to Parsons in New York. The duo have been appointed professors of Design and Emerging Technology at The New School, which encompasses Parsons School of Design.

Publications 
 Anthony Dunne and Fiona Raby,Design Noir: The Secret Life of Electronic Objects, Basel: Birkhäuser, 2001. .
 Anthony Dunne and Fiona Raby, 'Between Reality and the Impossible' In: Biennale Internationale Design Saint-Étiennne 2010. Cité du Design Éditions, Saint-Étienne, France, pp. 129–153.  
 Anthony Dunne and Fiona Raby, Speculative Everything: Design, Fiction and Social Dreaming, The MIT Press, 2013. .
 Paola Antonelli, Emma Dexter, Fiona Raby, Iwona Blazwick, Darkitecture: Learning Architecture for the Twenty-First Century Two Little Boys, 2013.

References

External links 
 Raby's Page in the archive of research processes and output produced by RCA
 

Academics of the Royal College of Art
Alumni of the Royal College of Art
Critical design practitioners
British industrial designers
Industrial designers
Product designers
Living people
1963 births